2020 Ukrainian Athletics Championships among the athletes of the senior age category was held on 29–30 August in Lutsk at Avanhard Stadium.

The competition was originally scheduled for 19–21 June. However, it was postponed to a later date due to the COVID-19 pandemic. Finally, the competition dates were set to 29–30 August.

Throughout the year, a number of standalone national championships in different events not contested in Lutsk will be held among the athletes of the senior age category.

Medalists

Men

Women

Other championships

Stadium events 

 2020 Ukrainian Winter Throwing Championships was held on 14–16 February in Mukachevo. Athletes contested in three throwing events (discus throw, hammer throw and javelin throw). It was the key competition for selection of the national team for the European Throwing Cup.
 2020 Ukrainian 10,000 Metres Championships was originally scheduled for 25 April in Uzhhorod at Avanhard Stadium. However, it was postponed to a later date due to the COVID-19 pandemic. Finally, it was scheduled for 15 August in Lutsk at Avanhard Stadium.

Men

Women

Road race walk 

 2020 Ukrainian Winter Race Walking Championships was held on 14 March in Ivano-Frankivsk.
 2020 Ukrainian 20 Kilometres Race Walk Championships was originally scheduled for 16 June in Sumy. However, it was first postponed to a later date due to the COVID-19 pandemic. Finally, it was scheduled for 18 October in Ivano-Frankivsk.
 2020 Ukrainian 50 Kilometres Race Walk Championships will be held on 18 October in Ivano-Frankivsk.

Men

Women

Trail, mountain and cross country running 

2020 national championships in trail, mountain (uphill-downhill, uphill and long distance) and cross country running were cancelled due to the COVID-19 pandemic.

Road running 

 2020 Ukrainian Half Marathon Championships was originally scheduled for 16 May in Kovel. However, it was first postponed to a later date due to the COVID-19 pandemic. Finally, it was held on 13 September in Kovel.
 2020 Ukrainian 12-hour, 24-hour and 48-hour Running Championships was held on 14–16 August in Vinnytsia.
 2020 national championships in the rest of the road running events (1 mile, 10 km, 50 km, 100 km, marathon) were cancelled due to the COVID-19 pandemic.

Men

Women

Live stream 

Ukrainian Athletics streamed all events of the main (29-30 August) and racewalk (18 October) championships live:

Main champs 

 Main stream:
 
 
 
 
 Stream of certain events:
 Day 1 (29 August):
 
 
 
 
 
 
 
 Day 2 (30 August):

Racewalk champs

See also 

 2020 Ukrainian Athletics Indoor Championships

References

External links 

 2020 athletics competitions calendar on the Ukrainian Athletic Federation's web-site 
 Championships' web-pages on the Ukrainian Athletic Federation's web-site:
 main
 winter throwing 
 winter race walking 
 12-hour, 24-hour, 48-hour run
 10,000 metres
 half marathon
 20 and 50 km race walking

Ukrainian Athletics Championships
Ukrainian Athletics Championships
Ukrainian Athletics Championships
Sport in Mukachevo
Sport in Ivano-Frankivsk
Sport in Lutsk
Sport in Vinnytsia
Sport in Volyn Oblast
Ukrainian Athletics Championships